Samson Cerfberr of Medelsheim (born at Strasburg about 1780; committed suicide at Paris, 1826) was a French soldier and author.

Life
A French Jew and relative of Herz Cerfbeer of Medelsheim, he was born in Strasbourg, France, and held office in Westphalia under the name of "Medelsheim". He led an erratic and adventurous life, wandering over the world, changing his name and even his religion several times. 

Cerfberr joined the Ottoman army as a mercenary, and converted into Islam, adopting the name Ibrahim Mansur Effendi. In 1813, he fought against the rebel Serbs in the Eyalet of Bosnia, serving alongside Osman Gradaščević in the district of Zvornik; the Serbs were eventually defeated after the arrival of the Ottoman Grand Vizier Hursid Pasha later that year.

At the end of the war he wandered throughout the East, sojourned for a time in Austria and in Nafplio, and in the period of 1816–19 served in the army of Ali Pasha of Ioannina.

On his return home Cerfberr published a work entitled Mémoires sur la Grèce et l'Albanie Pendant le Gouvernement d'Ali-Pacha (1826).

Work
 Mémoires sur la Grèce et l'Albanie Pendant le Gouvernement d'Ali-Pacha (Paris, 1826). The second edition of 1827, online from Google books, the second edition of 1828, online from Google books

See also
Selim III
Mahmud II
Ibrahim Bushati

Annotations
His name is also spelled Samson Cerf-Berr.

References

Sources
 Source
La Grande Encyclopédie, x.50;
Nouveau Larousse illustré, ii.627

French soldiers
French expatriates in Turkey
Alsatian Jews
Writers from Strasbourg
Suicides in France
1780 births
1826 deaths
Ottoman military personnel of the Serbian Revolution
People from the Ottoman Empire of French descent
Ali Pasha of Ioannina
1820s suicides
Military personnel from Strasbourg